St Albans City railway station, also known simply as St Albans, is one of two railway stations serving the city of St Albans in Hertfordshire, England (the other being ). The 'City' station is the larger of the two, as it is on the better-connected Midland Main Line  from London St Pancras, being served by Govia Thameslink trains on the Thameslink route.

History
The station was built by the Midland Railway in 1868, on its extension to St Pancras. St Albans was famous for producing watercress, which was sent in  lots to London and Manchester.

The other station, was built by the London and North Western Railway in 1858. There was originally a further station called London Road, built by the Hatfield and St Albans Railway in 1863 to connect with the Great Northern Railway.

Description 
The station has four platforms, two for each direction: one "fast" and one "slow".  The main entrance, ticket office, multi-storey car park, taxi rank and bus connections are on Station Way, east of the station. There is a second exit to the west, to a small surface car park off Ridgmont Road and Victoria Street, located at the original entrance to the station. A larger surface car park to the east of the railway lines gained planning permission in 2003, in connection with a large residential development.

There are ticket barriers at both entrances.

The station participates in the Plusbus scheme where combined train and bus tickets can be bought at a reduced price.

The station underwent a refurbishment which saw the main entrance being completely rebuilt. This refurbishment included a complete rebuild of the retail unit located at the main entrance, Moving the toilets from platform 2 and 3 to Platforms 1 and 4. A new entrance on Platform 4 was also built, which included brand new Cycle storage facilities. Refurbishment of the station was completed in December 2021. 

The station currently houses a Sainsburys local which opened in February 2022 There are also 3 more retail units, 2 on Platform 1 and one on Platform 4. However, these have not been filled since the station refurbishment in 2021.

St Albans South signal box has been restored immediately south of the station and has been opened as a visitor attraction by the St Albans Signal Box Preservation Trust.

Construction of a second footbridge was completed in 2022
.

Services 
All services at St Albans City are operated by Thameslink using  EMUs.

The typical off-peak service in trains per hour is:
 2 tph to  via 
 2 tph to Three Bridges via 
 2 tph to  via 

References

Bibliography

External links

Transport in St Albans
Railway stations in Hertfordshire
DfT Category B stations
Former Midland Railway stations
Railway stations in Great Britain opened in 1868
Railway stations served by Govia Thameslink Railway
Buildings and structures in St Albans